"Can I Come to You" is a song written by Jerry Crutchfield and Buddy Killen. It was recorded by American country singer-songwriter Bill Anderson. It was released as a single in 1974 via MCA Records and became a major hit the same year.

Background and release
"Can I Come to You" was recorded on March 6, 1974, at Bradley's Barn, located in Mount Juliet, Tennessee. The sessions were produced by Owen Bradley, who would serve as Anderson's producer through most of years with Decca Records. The album's B-side track was recorded during the same session: "I'm Happily Married (And Plan to Stay That Way)."

"Can I Come Home to You" was released as a single by MCA Records in May 1974. The song spent 14 weeks on the Billboard Hot Country Singles before reaching number 24 in August 1974. In Canada, the single became an even larger hit. It reached number two on the RPM Country Songs chart in 1974 in Canada. It was released on his 1974 studio album, "Whispering" Bill Anderson.

Track listings
7" vinyl single
 "Can I Come Home to You" – 2:48
 "I'm Happily Married (And Plan to Stay That Way)" – 2:54

Chart performance

References

1974 singles
1974 songs
Bill Anderson (singer) songs
MCA Records singles
Song recordings produced by Owen Bradley
Songs written by Jerry Crutchfield
Songs written by Buddy Killen